Camille de Morlhon (19 February 1869 - 24 November 1952) was a French film director.

Filmography 

 1908 : Les Reflets vivants
 1908 : Quand l'amour veut
 1908 : La Fille du gardien de phare
 1908 : Domestique malgré lui
 1908 : Cœur de femme
 1908 : Pour l'uniforme
 1908 : Benvenuto Cellini
 1908 : Un suiveur obstiné
 1908 : Un tic gênant
 1909 : Une excursion incohérente
 1909 : Le Subterfuge
 1909 : Par l'enfant
 1909 : Mater Dolorosa
 1909 : La Gueuse
 1909 : La Fiancée du prince
 1909 : Le Fer à cheval
 1909 : La Doublure
 1909 : La Couronne
 1909 : Conscience de miséreux
 1909 : Cœur de Gavroche
 1909 : Le Bouquet de violettes
 1909 : Bidachou facteur
 1909 : La Belle Niçoise
 1909 : Bandits mondains
 1909 : À bon chat, bon rat
 1909 : Olivier Cromwell
 1909 : Nous voulons un valet de chambre
 1909 : Mademoiselle Faust
 1909 : Le Mannequin
 1909 : La Petite Policière
 1909 : Les Deux Pigeons
 1909 : La Récompense d'une bonne action
 1909 : La Petite Rosse 
 1909 : Une leçon de charité
 1909 : Hercule au régiment
 1910 : Une aventure secrète de Marie-Antoinette
 1910 : Souvenez-vous en
 1910 : La Reine Margot after Alexandre Dumas
 1910 : Polyeucte
 1910 : Paillasse
 1910 : L'Idylle du peintre
 1910 : Bedouallah assassin (Bidouillard assassin)
 1910 : L'Auberge rouge, after Honoré de Balzac
 1910 : Un épisode de 1812 
 1910 : Le Roman de l'écuyère
 1910 : Je veux mourir !
 1910 : Le Bon Patron
 1910 : Oliver Twist (L'Enfance d'Oliver Twist)
 1910 : Jemmy
 1910 : Cagliostro, Aventurier, Chimiste et Magicien
 1910 : Le Tyran de Jérusalem
 1910 : L'Encrier perfectionné
 1911 : Une intrigue à la cour d'Henri VIII
 1911 : La Savelli
 1911 : La Ruse du petit ramoneur
 1911 : La Rançon du roi Jean
 1911 : Radgrune
 1911 : Le Noël du chemineau
 1911 : La Mémoire du cœur
 1911 : La Légende du vieux sonneur
 1911 : L'Histoire d'une rose
 1911 : Fouquet, l'homme au masque de fer
 1911 : La Fillette et la poupée
 1911 : L'Électrocuté
 1911 : Madame Tallien
 1911 : Sémiramis
 1911 : Une conspiration sous Henri III
 1912 : Le Testament de l'oncle d'Anselme
 1912 : Britannicus
 1912 : L'Affaire du collier de la reine
 1912 : Serment de fumeur
 1912 : Les Mains d'Yvonne
 1912 : Cireurs obstinés
 1912 : Le Fils prodigue
 1912 : Pour voir les moukères
 1912 : La Belle Princesse et le marchand
 1912 : Un mariage sous Louis XV
 1912 : La Haine de Fatimeh
 1912 : La Fiancée du spahi
 1912 : Gorgibus et Sganarelle
 1912 : L'Ambitieuse
 1912 : La Prière de l'enfant
 1912 : Vengeance kabyle
 1913 : Une brute humaine
 1913 : Le Secret de l'orpheline
 1913 : Double face (L'Infamie d'un autre)
 1913 : L'Escarpolette tragique
 1913 : L'Usurier
 1913 : Don Quichotte
 1913 : Charmeuse (La Broyeuse de cœurs)
 1913 : La Calomnie
 1913 : La Fleuriste de Toneso (Les Fleurs de Toneso)
 1914 : Vingt ans de haine
 1914 : La Vieillesse du père Moreux
 1914 : Le Roman du tzigane
 1914 : Sacrifice surhumain
 1915 : Une erreur tragique (La Marchande de fleurs)
 1915 : L'Intrus (Sous l'uniforme)
 1915 : Le Faux Père
 1916 : Le Rayon mystérieux (Les Effluves funestes)
 1916 : Cœur de Gavroche
 1916 : Fille d'artiste
 1916 : Le Secret de Geneviève
 1917 : Marise (Maryse)
 1917 : La Bourrasque (L'Orage)
 1917 : Madeleine (Miséricorde)
 1918 : Simone
 1918 : Y'a plus d'enfants
 1918 : L'Expiation
 1919 : L'Impasse Messidor
 1919 : Éliane
 1919 : L'Ibis bleu
 1920 : Fille du peuple
 1920 : Fabienne
 1920 : Une fleur dans les ronces
 1923 : Tote
 1930 : Roumanie, terre d'amour

Bibliography 
 Camille de Morlhon, homme de cinéma (1869-1952), par Éric Le Roy, L'Harmattan, 1997 ;

External links 
 
 Camille de Morlhon sur 1895.revues.org

Film directors from Paris
1869 births
1952 deaths